Hoopersville is an unincorporated community in Dorchester County, Maryland, United States. The Hooper Island Light was listed on the National Register of Historic Places in 2002.

References

Hoopers Island
Unincorporated communities in Dorchester County, Maryland
Unincorporated communities in Maryland
Maryland populated places on the Chesapeake Bay